Guy Davis may refer to:

Guy Davis (comics) (born 1966), American comic book artist
Guy Davis (musician) (born 1952), American blues guitarist, actor, and musician
Guy Davis (drummer) (born  1983), drummer in the British rock band Reuben